Carl Henry may refer to:
Carol Henry (photographer) (born 1960), American fine arts photographer
Carl Henry (singer) (born 1974), Canadian singer
Carl F. H. Henry (1913–2003), evangelical theologian
Carl Henry (basketball) (born 1960), American former basketball player
Carl Henry (politician) (1905–1995), Norwegian politician
C. J. Henry (born 1986), or Carl Henry, Jr., athlete, son of the basketball player

See also
Karl Henry (born 1982), English footballer